East Germany (German Democratic Republic) competed at the 1968 Winter Olympics in Grenoble, France.  East German athletes had competed together with West German athletes as the United Team of Germany in the previous three Winter Olympic Games, but both nations sent independent teams starting in 1968.

Medalists

Alpine skiing

Men

Men's slalom

Biathlon

Men

 1 One minute added per close miss (a hit in the outer ring), two minutes added per complete miss.

Men's 4 x 7.5 km relay

 2 A penalty loop of 200 metres had to be skied per missed target.

Cross-country skiing

Men

Men's 4 × 10 km relay

Women

Women's 3 x 5 km relay

Figure skating

Men

Women

Pairs

Ice hockey

First round

 East Germany -   Norway 3:1 (2:1, 1:0, 0:0) 
Goalscorers: Joachim Ziesche, Lothar Fuchs, Peter Prusa - Odd Syversen.

Final Round 

 
 USSR –  East Germany 9:0  (4:0, 2:0, 3:0)
Goalscorers: Firsov 3, Vikulov 2, Mišakov, Staršinov, Alexandrov, Zajcev.
Referees: Wycisk (POL), Johannessen (NOR)

 Canada –  East Germany 11:0  (4:0, 4:0, 3:0)
Goalscorers: Mott 4, Huck 2, Hargreaves, O’Shea, Bourbonnais, Monteith, H. Pinder.
Referees: Trumble (USA), Sillankorva (FIN)

  Sweden –  East Germany 5:2  (1:0, 2:1, 2:1)
Goalscorers: Hedlund 2, Wickberg, Lundström, Henriksson – Plotka, Fuchs.
Referees: Seglin (URS), Wycisk (POL)

 Czechoslovakia –  East Germany 10:3  (5:2, 1:0, 4:1) 
Goalscorers: Horešovský 4, Nedomanský 2, Jiřík, Suchý, Kochta, Ševčík – Karrenbauer, Novy, Peters. 
Referees: Dahlberg (SWE), Sillankorva (FIN)

 East Germany –  Finland 2:3  (1:2, 0:1, 1:0)
Goalscorers: R. Noack, Peters – Harju 2, Keinonen.
Referees: Bucala (TCH), Dahlberg (SWE)

 East Germany –  USA 4:6  (1:3, 1:1, 2:2)
Goalscorers: Fuchs 2, Karrenbauer 2 – Stordahl 2, P. Hurley 2, Volmar, Lilyholm.
Referees: Kubinec (CAN), Seglin (URS)

 East Germany –  West Germany 2:4  (0:1, 1:2, 1:1)
Goalscorers: Hiller, Fuchs – Funk, Waitl, Hanig, Lax.
Referees: McEvoy (CAN), Kořínek (TCH)

Contestants
8. EAST GERMANY
Goaltenders: Dieter Pürschel, Klaus Hirche. 
Defence: Dieter Voigt, Manfred Buder, Helmut Novy, Dieter Kratzsch, Wolfgang Plotka, Wilfried Sock, Ulrich Noack. 
Forwards: Bernd Karrenbauer, Hartmut Nickel, Lothar Fuchs, Peter Prusa, Joachim Ziesche, Bernd Poindl, Dietmar Peters, Bernd Hiller, Rüdiger Noack.
Coach: Rudi Schmieder.

Luge

Men

(Men's) Doubles

Women

Nordic combined 

Events:
 normal hill ski jumping 
 15 km cross-country skiing

Ski jumping

Speed skating

Women

References
Official Olympic Reports
International Olympic Committee results database
 Olympic Winter Games 1968, full results by sports-reference.com

Germany, East
1968
Winter Olympics